The Ministry of the Imperial Court was established in Russia in 1826, and embraced in one institution all the former separate branches of the Court administration.

The Ministry of the Court was under the personal cognizance of His Majesty the Emperor, and therefore, rendered account of all its affairs to his majesty alone. After the February Revolution of 1917, the Ministry was abolished.

Structure
 Minister of the Court
 Assistant minister
 Ministerial council
 General sections
 Cabinet of His Imperial Majesty
 Altay and Nerchinsk Metallurgical works (silver and gold mines)
 Imperial Porcelain Factory
 Ekaterinburg granite works
 Principality of Lowicz in the Kingdom of Poland
 Chancery of the Minister
 Control
 Cash department
 Medical inspection
 General Archives
 Special sections
 Section of the Marshal of the Court, for the provisioning of the Imperial Court and the arrangement of receptions. 
 Expedition of Ceremonies
 Chancery of HIM the Empress
 The clergy of the Court under the direction of the Protopresbyter of the Cathedral of the Imperial Winter Palace and the Cathedral of the Annunciation in Moscow
 The private library of His Imperial Majesty
 The Imperial Hermitage and its Museum of Arts
 The Imperial Academy of Arts 
 The Imperial Archaeological Commission, which supervised all archaeological research in Russia. 
 Direction of the Imperial Theatres in St. Petersburg and Moscow
 The Court choristers
 The Imperial band of Musicians
 The Imperial Stables
 The Imperial Hunt
 The electrotechnical section, superintending the lighting of the palaces etc.
 Company of Court Grenadiers - instituted for distinguishing and rewarding meritorious soldiers. These grenadiers performed sentinel duty at certain monuments and in the palaces etc. 
 Chapter of Imperial and Royal Orders
 Chief department of Appanages

See also
 Royal Households of the United Kingdom
 Maison du Roi (France)
 Imperial Household Ministry (Japan)

Sources 
 Statesman's handbook for Russia. 1896.
 Saint Petersburg Encyclopedia

Imperial Court
1826 establishments in the Russian Empire
1917 disestablishments in Russia
Royal households